Adrien Backscheider (born 7 August 1992) is a French cross-country skier. He competed for France at the 2014 and 2018 Winter Olympics in the cross-country skiing events.

Cross-country skiing results
All results are sourced from the International Ski Federation (FIS).

Olympic Games
 1 medal – (1 bronze)

Distance reduced to 30 km due to weather conditions.

World Championships
 2 medals – (2 bronze)

World Cup

Season standings

References

External links

1992 births
Living people
Olympic cross-country skiers of France
Cross-country skiers at the 2014 Winter Olympics
Cross-country skiers at the 2018 Winter Olympics
Cross-country skiers at the 2022 Winter Olympics
French male cross-country skiers
FIS Nordic World Ski Championships medalists in cross-country skiing
Medalists at the 2018 Winter Olympics
Olympic bronze medalists for France
Olympic medalists in cross-country skiing
Tour de Ski skiers
Sportspeople from Metz
20th-century French people
21st-century French people